The Diocese of Lisieux was a Roman Catholic ecclesiastical territory in France, centered on Lisieux, in Calvados.

The bishop of Lisieux was the Ordinary of the Roman Catholic Diocese of Lisieux. The first known Bishop of Lisieux is one Theodibandes, mentioned in connection with a council held in 538.

The bishopric was suppressed during the French revolution and was not reinstated. Present day Lisieux is part of the Diocese of Bayeux.

History

A list of alleged early bishops of Lisieux was included in the Ritual of Lisieux, published in 1661 under the direction of Bishop Léonor (I) Goyon de Matignon. The list, however, was padded with the names of saints whose putative relics were stored in the Cathedral.  These included Saint Ursinus, Saint Patrick and Saint Cande, none of whom can be shown to have been a bishop.  The Bishop of Lisieux was ex-officio Conservator of the University of Caen.

The Chapter of the Cathedral of Saint-Pierre was composed of nine dignities and thirty Canons.  The dignities were: the Dean, the Cantor, the Treasurer, the Capicerio, the Magister Scholarum, and the  four Archdeacons (Lieuven, Auge, Pont-Audemer, and Gacé). All were appointed by the bishop, except the Dean, who was elected by the Chapter. There were thirty-one prebends, the first eleven of whom had the title of 'Baron'. The Cathedral also had four Vicars and thirty chaplains.

The diocese of Lisieux contained 487 parishes and 520 rectories.

On its territory there were six abbeys for men and two for women. Almost all of these houses belonged to the Order of Saint Benedict: the male abbeys of Saint-Evroul, Bernay, Préaux, Grestain, Cormeilles, as also the two female houses of Saint-Léger, and Saint-Désir. The sole exception was the male Abbey of Mondaye, located at Mont-Dée, which was a house of Canons Regular belonging  to the Order of Premonstratensians.

A synod was held at Lisieux in 1055 by the Papal Legate, Bishop Hermanfried of Sion, with the cooperation of Duke William d'EU "the Bastard" son of Richard I of Normandy, in which Archbishop Malgerius of Rouen was deposed. His dissolute life was notorious, he had refused to attend a Roman Council though summoned, and he made rebellion against the Duke. The deposition had already been agreed to by Pope Leo IX.

In the middle of October 1106, King Henry I of England visited Lisieux, where he held an assembly of the leading figures  of the duchy of Normandy, both lay and ecclesiastical. He dealt with the disorders which had been caused by his brother Robert, taking hostages (who were sent to England) including Duke Robert, and condemning to imprisonment for life Count Guillaume Werlenc of Mortain, Robert d'Estouteville, and several others.

The Collège de Lisieux was founded at Paris in 1336 by Bishop Guy de Harcourt, Bishop of Lisieux, by testamentary bequest, and with additional endowments from three members of the d'Estouteville family. It supported twenty-four poor students of the diocese. It lasted until 1764, when it was transferred to the Collège de Dormans.

In August 1417, King Henry V of England besieged, captured and sacked the city of Lisieux. When the Bishop of Lisieux, Pierre Fresnel, was killed in street fighting in Paris on 12 June 1418, King Henry considered it a good moment to install a bishop in Lisieux who would be favorable to the English cause. His wishes ran contrary to those of Pope Martin V, leading to the appointment of Cardinal Branda Castiglione as administrator of the diocese. When Henry died on 31 August 1422, Martin V was able to appoint Castiglione's nephew as bishop.

List of bishops

To 1000

Theudobaudis c. 538–c. 549
Edibius ? (between 557 and 573)
Ætherius c. 560?
Chamnegisilus (or Launomundus) (c. 614)
Launebaud (Launobaud) 9c. 644)
Hincho (c. 660)
[Leudebold (Léodebold)] (c. 662)
Freculf (823/5–850/2)
Airard (Hairard) c. 853–c. 880
Roger (Rogier) c. 985–1022 or c. 980–c. 1018

1000 to 1300

Robert c. 1022–c. 1025
Herbert c. 1026–1049
Hugo d'Eu, 1049–1077 (Rollonide)
Gilbert Maminot 1077–1101
Fulcher (Foucher) 1101–1103
[Thomas of Lisieux - son of Ranulf Flambard]
John 1107–1141
Arnulf (Arnoul) of Lisieux 1141–1181, statesman and writer
Raoul de Varneville 1182–1191 or 1192
Guillaume de Ruffière (Rupière) 1192–1201
Jourdain du Houmet (Hommet) 1202–1218
Guillaume Du Pont-de-L'Arche 1218–1250
Foulque D'Astin 1250–1267
Guy du Merle 1267–1285
Guillaume D'Asnières 1285–1298
Jean de Samois, O.Min. 1299–1302

1300 to 1500

Guy D'Harcourt 1303–1336
Guillaume de Charmont 1336–49
Guillaume Guitard 1349–1358
Jean de Dormans 1359–1361
Adhémar Robert 1361–1368
Alphonse Chevrier 1369–1377
Nicole Oresme 1377–1382
 Guillaume d'Estouteville 1382–1415
Pierre Fresnel 1415–1418
Mathieu Du Bosc 1418–1419
Branda Castiglione (Cardinal) 1420–1424 (Administrator)
Zénon Castiglione 1424–1432
Pierre Cauchon 1432–1442
Pasquier de Vaux 1443–1447
Thomas Basin 1447–1474
Antoine Raguier 1475–1482
Etienne Blosset de Carrouges 1482–1505

From 1500

Jean Le Veneur (Cardinal de Tillières) 1505–1539
Jacques D'Annebaut (Cardinal) 1539–1558
Jean Hennuyer 1561–1578
[Denys Rouxel]
Jean de Vassé 1580–1583
Anne de Pérusse D'Escars de Giury, O.S.B. 1589–1598 (Cardinal)
François Rouxel de Médavy 1600–1617
Guillaume du Vair 1618–1621
Guillaume Aleaume (Alleaume) 1622–1634
Philippe Cospeau 1636–1646
Léonor I Goyon de Matignon 1646–1674
Léonor II Goyon de Matignon 1675–1714
Henri-Ignace de Brancas 1714–1760
Jacques Marie de Caritat de Condorcet 1761–1783
Jules-Basile Perron (Ferron) de La Ferronays 1783–1790

See also
 Catholic Church in France
 List of Catholic dioceses in France

Notes

Bibliography

Reference works
  (Use with caution; obsolete)
  (in Latin) 
 (in Latin)

Studies

Hardy, V. (1917) La cathédrale St-Pierre de Lisieux Paris: Frazier-Soye

Piel, Léopold Ferdinand Désiré (1891a), Inventaire historique des actes transcrits aux insinuations ecclésiastiques de l'ancien diocèse de Lisieux, ou, Documents officiels analysés pour servir à l'histoire du personnel de l'évêché, de la cathédrale, des collégiale, des abbayes et prieurés, des paroisses et chapelles, ainsi que de toutes les familles notables de ce diocèse, 1692-1790, Tome I (in French), Lisieux: E. Lerebour.
Piel, Léopold Ferdinand Désiré (1891), Inventaire historique des actes transcrits aux insinuations ecclésiastiques de l'ancien diocèse de Lisieux, ou, Documents officiels analysés pour servir à l'histoire du personnel de l'évêché, de la cathédrale, des collégiale, des abbayes et prieurés, des paroisses et chapelles, ainsi que de toutes les familles notables de ce diocèse, 1692-1790, Tome II (in French), Lisieux: E. Lerebour.
Piel, Léopold Ferdinand Désiré (1891c), Inventaire historique des actes transcrits aux insinuations ecclésiastiques de l'ancien diocèse de Lisieux, ou, Documents officiels analysés pour servir à l'histoire du personnel de l'évêché, de la cathédrale, des collégiale, des abbayes et prieurés, des paroisses et chapelles, ainsi que de toutes les familles notables de ce diocèse, 1692-1790, Tome III (in French), Lisieux: E. Lerebour.
Piel, Léopold Ferdinand Désiré (1891d), Inventaire historique des actes transcrits aux insinuations ecclésiastiques de l'ancien diocèse de Lisieux, ou, Documents officiels analysés pour servir à l'histoire du personnel de l'évêché, de la cathédrale, des collégiale, des abbayes et prieurés, des paroisses et chapelles, ainsi que de toutes les familles notables de ce diocèse, 1692-1790, Tome IV (in French), Lisieux: E. Lerebour.
Piel, Léopold Ferdinand Désiré (1891e), Inventaire historique des actes transcrits aux insinuations ecclésiastiques de l'ancien diocèse de Lisieux, ou, Documents officiels analysés pour servir à l'histoire du personnel de l'évêché, de la cathédrale, des collégiale, des abbayes et prieurés, des paroisses et chapelles, ainsi que de toutes les familles notables de ce diocèse, 1692-1790, Tome V (in French), Lisieux: E. Lerebour.

lis
Ancient Diocese of Lisieux